Rostock Airport, German: Flughafen Rostock-Laage , is the airport of Rostock, the largest city in the German state Mecklenburg-Vorpommern, and is named after Laage, within the boundary of which it is located. Laage is a town in the Rostock district. It features flights to major cities throughout Germany as well as some leisure routes. In addition to civil activity, Jagdgeschwader 73 of the German Air Force is stationed on the military side of the airport.

History
Construction of the airport began in 1979 as a National People's Army facility. It became operational in 1984 with the Fighter Wing JBG 77 and the Navy Fighter Wing 28. It was deactivated by the Bundeswehr in 1990 and was reactivated in 1993 when Jagdgeschwader 73 was posted there. In the same year the Rostock-Laage-Güstrow GmbH begins civilian operations on a 60 hectare section of the airport.

The airport is expected to post losses of €2.8 million for 2013 while the passenger numbers decreased by 12 percent in the same year. As the government of Mecklenburg-Vorpommern is not willing to give additional financial aid, the airport operator may face bankruptcy in the near future. In October 2014, Rainer Schwarz, a former general manager of Berlin Brandenburg Airport was appointed to the same position at Rostock–Laage Airport. After the British regional airline Flybmi, which operated flights to Munich and Stuttgart ceased the operation and declared bankruptcy, Lufthansa took over the route from Rostock to Munich with a twice daily rotation (except from Wednesday and Saturday) with Bombardier CRJ900 aircraft.

In 2019, the airport suffered a sharp downfall in passenger numbers with a decrease by more than half to just 148,000. This was mainly caused by the shutdown of Germania which operated several leisure routes from Rostock.

In February 2021, Lufthansa Aviation Training relocated their practical training from Bremen Airport to Rostock.

Facilities
The airport consists of one modern passenger terminal building containing a large check-in hall as well as some shops and restaurants. The building is equipped with two jet bridges and apron positions. Rostock–Laage Airport usually sees traffic by mid-sized aircraft such as the Airbus A320 but is equipped to handle wide-body aircraft up to the Boeing 747-400. It also has several stands for smaller general aviation planes.

Airlines and destinations
The following airlines operate seasonal flights at Rostock Airport:

Additionally, the airport is frequently used for non-public cruiseship charter flights to and from Southern Europe to carry passengers travelling to and from the nearby cruise port of Warnemünde. The nearest major international airports are Berlin Brandenburg Airport  to the south and Hamburg Airport  to the west.

Statistics

Ground transportation
For all scheduled and most charter flights, a direct bus connection to Rostock Hauptbahnhof (25 km distance) is provided by the regional public transport company (Rebus). A special fare ("Flughafenticket") is introduced, allowing passengers to use suburban trains and street cars within the City of Rostock for one connecting trip. The same applies for one additional trip on regional busses from Rostock within the integrated fare region of Rostock.

The motorways A19 (Rostock–Berlin) and A20 (Lübeck–Szczecin) are nearby. There are 4 parking areas at the airport with more than 1,000 parking spots in total.

Several international as well as local car rental agencies are located at the airport.

See also
 Transport in Germany
 List of airports in Germany

References

External links

 Official website
 
 

Airport
Buildings and structures in Rostock (district)
Transport in Rostock
Luftstreitkräfte airbases
Bases of the German Air Force
Rostock